Elambalur is the nearest village to Perambalur (3.6 km) and to NH-45 road (2 km).  It is a special village in Perambalur district, Tamil Nadu, India.   It includes the hamlet villages of Indira Nagar, MGR nagar, MahathmaGandhi Nagar, Samathuvapuram and Nethaji Nagar.

Climatic conditions 

 Climate:         Tropical
 Category:        Medium and High Region
 Rainfall:        Around 908 mm
 Precipitation:   45–50%

Geography 

The pachaimalai (green hill) Eastern ghats starts from here.

The geographical location of Elambalur:

Government offices and institutions 
 SIDCO Industrial Estate
 The RTO-Perambulur (TN-46)
 Armed Reserve Police Campus
 District TASMAC go-down
 District Cooperative Agri-Marketing Committee
 Govt. Primary Health Center

Economy 
Stone quarries, mining, and Stone Crushing are major industries in Elambalur. However, a majority of the people work in agriculture and engaged in building constructions jobs

SIDCO will soon be setting up an Industrial Estate at the Elambalur Village. Approval of site measuring 44.4 acres at Elambalur has been completed for SIDCO Project.

 Major crops : Paddy rice, maize, millet, sugarcane, tapioca, cotton, onion, chill peppers and groundnuts in the Perambalur District Area, including Elambalur.

Politics
Perambalur assembly constituency former member (MLA) Tamilselvan M.A belongs to Elambalur village. He was elected in the recent Assembly election conducted by Election commission of India. From 1986 to 2001 Mr.M.Rajaram won in all local body elections and served as president and union chairman. He developed Elambalur panchayat to a city level.
It is a part of the Perambalur (Lok Sabha constituency)

Transport
Recently the government of Tamil Nadu operated a new express bus service to Chennai from Elambalur every day.

Educational institutions 
Government Higher Secondary school
Thanthai Hans Roever High school
Roever college of Engineering
Roever College of Engineering and Technology
Thanthai Roever College of Arts & science
Thanthai Hans Roever college of Nursing
Thanthai Hans Roever college for B.Ed. courses
Thanthai Hans Roever college of Agriculture  
Thanthai Hans Roever College of Physiotherapy 
Thanthai Hans Roever College of Pharmacy 
Thanthai Hans Roever Institute of Medical Laboratory Technology 
Roever Industrial Training Institute 
Saint Joseph's Matric. Hr. Sec. School

See also
Perambalur
Pachaimalai Hills

References

Notes
indiawater.gov.in "Elambalur and its Hamlet villages"
"censusindia.gov.in"
"Rough stone Quarry leases granted in Elambalur"
"Regarding the Holy Sidhas"

"Industrial Estate in Elambalur"
SIDCO Govt.Industrial Policy
"Govt, Official site for villages"

External links
Perambalur home page

Cities and towns in Perambalur district